Fieldhead are a British band formed in Leeds, England, in 2008 and led by Paul Elam, a member of The Declining Winter. Paul currently resides in London, whilst violinists Elaine Reynolds and Sarah Kemp (both also of The Declining Winter) reside in Manchester and Newcastle upon Tyne respectively. Fieldhead's music is ambient/electronica in style, and is created using a combination of electronics and acoustic instruments.

Fieldhead have toured extensively in Europe and Canada, having performed with Tim Hecker, Machinefabriek, Grouper, Amiina and Jeniferever.

Releases
Fieldhead self-released their debut EP "Introductions" in December 2008, and this was followed by the release of their debut album They Shook Hands for Hours on Home Assembly Music in November 2009.

In 2010, the band produced four releases: a split CD EP "Crest" with the Danish act Iris to Hypnos released in February 2010 on Static Caravan Recordings; a 10" vinyl record EP "Riser" released in July 2010 on Gizeh Records (featuring vocal contributions from Anna-Lynne Williams of Trespassers William, Chantal Acda, Anneke Kampman of Conquering Animal Sound, Elly May Irving of Glissando and Esker); a digital download live album Long Train Journeys released on Gizeh Records in November 2010; and a digital download single, "reference line", released on CSAF records in November 2010.

Fieldhead's second studio album, a correction, was released as an LP record by Gizeh Records on 22 October 2012.

Fieldhead's latest studio album, We've All Been Swimming, was released on Home Assembly Music on 30 June 2017.

Discography

Studio albums
They Shook Hands for Hours (2009)
a correction (2012)
We've All Been Swimming (2017)

Live albums
Long Train Journeys (2010)

EPs
Introductions (2008)
Crest (2010)
Riser (2010)
'Fury and Hecla' - split EP w. Loscil (2014)

Singles
reference line (2010)

References

External links
Website
Last.FM page
Discography on discogs

Interviews
McMeeken, Euan. “Interview No. 21 – Fieldhead.” The Steinberg Principle, 2010.
Causton, Deborah. “Interview with Fieldhead | Indigits.” Indigits, 2010.
Zezulka, Kate. “Leeds Music Scene.” Leeds Music Scene, 2011.

Musical groups from Leeds
Musical groups established in 2008
English electronic music groups
British ambient music groups